Rampa rebellion of 1879 (also known as the First Rampa rebellion to distinguish it from the Rampa Rebellion of 1922-24) was an insurrection by the hill tribes in the Rampa region of the Vizagapatam Hill Tracts Agency of Vizagapatam District against the British government of the Madras Presidency.

Causes 

The hill tracts of Vishakhapatanam were inhabited by hill tribes who led a more or less independent way of life for centuries. These tribes either spoke Telugu or Odia or tribal dialects and paid a regular tribute to a zamindar or mansabdar who was a subject of British India. The then zamindar of the region, an illegitimate son of his predecessor, was an oppressive tyrant, there had been smaller riots and uprisings before, but to make matters worse, the Madras government introduced a law making toddy tapping illegal and introducing a toddy tax, this wouldn't have been a great deal to the Hill tribes, but toddy tapping was part of their culture. This led to a full-scale rebellion in early 1879.

Events 

The rebellion started in March 1879 when the hill tribes of Rampa made attacks on police stations in Chodavaram taluk. Soon, the rebellion spread to the Golconda hills of Vishagapatam and Bhadrachalam taluk. Within a short time, rebellion engulfed the whole district.

The Madras government responded by dispatching several companies of policemen, six regiments of Madras infantry, a squadron of Madras cavalry, two companies of sappers and miners and an infantry regiment from the Hyderabad army. The rebellion was eventually suppressed and a large number of revolutionaries were sent to the Andaman Jail.

Aftermath 

In the aftermath of the rebellion, various conciliatory measures were adopted by the British government. They tried to improve the condition of the tribals of East Godavari agency and the hill tracts in the norther part of Madras Presidency.

References 

 

History of Andhra Pradesh
Rebellions in India